Jessie Williams may refer to:

Jessie Williams (actress) in Tracy Beaker Returns
Jessie Williams (brothel-keeper)
Jessie Williams (musician) (fl.1899), see List of musicals: A to L
Jessie Williams, actress in Tracy Beaker Returns
Jessie Wanda Williams, singer and wife of singer Doc Williams

See also
Jesse Williams (disambiguation)
Jessica Williams (disambiguation)